Kfar Menahem (lit. Menahem Village) is a kibbutz in southern Israel. Located about 7 km east of Kiryat Malakhi, it falls under the jurisdiction of Yoav Regional Council.

History
Kfar Menahem (originally Irgun Menahem) was founded in 1935 by a group of pioneers from Rehovot. The village was named for Menachem Ussishkin. During the Arab revolt in 1936, the place was abandoned by Jews and destroyed by Arabs. On 28 July 1937, it  was re-established as a moshav but could not sustain itself. In 1939, the Irgun Menachem group was replaced by the Kvutzat Krit group from the United States, members of Hashomer Hatzair who were training in the moshava of Hadar, near Ramatayim. That year, members of the Irgun Menachem group who had left Kfar Menahem founded Kfar Warburg.

Kfar Menahem was established as a Tower and Stockade colony on December 6, 1939 on a 3,650 dunam tract which had been purchased in 1935. The founders were a group of 32 American immigrants. By 1943, there were 245 inhabitants who worked in mixed farming (grains, vegetables, cattle, sheep and poultry) and industry (carpentry and garage). 

After the 1948 Arab–Israeli War, the kibbutz expanded onto about 9,000 dunams on land of the depopulated Arab village of Idnibba.

The Yoav Regional Council high school "Tzafit" is located in Kfar Menahem. The kibbutz also operates a regional museum with a model of the original tower and stockade.

Architecture
The Beit Habanim culture hall in Kfar Menachem was designed by renowned architect R. Buckminster Fuller, inventor of the geodesic dome. It is an example of Brutalist architecture, using exposed concrete.

Notable people
 Juval Aviv (born 1947), former Mossad officer, later security consultant
 Sandra Bernhard, American comedian who worked as a volunteer in Kfar Menachem in the early 1970s

Gallery

References

External links
Official website 

Kibbutzim
Kibbutz Movement
Populated places established in 1935
Populated places established in 1937
1935 establishments in Mandatory Palestine
1937 establishments in Mandatory Palestine
Populated places in Southern District (Israel)